Burlington Resources Inc. was a company engaged in hydrocarbon exploration. In 2006, the company was acquired by ConocoPhillips.

History
In 1988, the company was formed to own the resource assets of Burlington Northern Railroad. The company became a public company.

In 1989, the company spun off Plum Creek Timber.

In 1997, the company acquired Louisiana Land & Exploration, gaining interest in properties in the Gulf of Mexico.

In 1999, the company acquired Poco Petroleums, gaining properties in the Western Canadian Sedimentary Basin. The company also acquired ARCO's operations in Ecuador.

In 2001, the company acquired Canadian Hunter Exploration, expanding its base in Canada.

In 2003, the company started production in Algeria.

In 2004, the company received approval to develop a gas field in China.

In 2006, the company was acquired by ConocoPhillips.

References

Defunct oil companies of the United States
Petroleum in Texas
Defunct companies based in Texas
Energy companies established in 1988
Non-renewable resource companies established in 1988
American companies established in 1988
Non-renewable resource companies disestablished in 2006
1988 establishments in Texas
2006 disestablishments in Texas